Vlăduleni may refer to several villages in Romania:

 Vlăduleni, a village in Bâlteni Commune, Gorj County
 Vlăduleni, a village in Osica de Sus Commune, Olt County